"The Killing Moon" is a song by the band Echo & the Bunnymen. It was released on 20 January 1984 as the lead single from their 1984 album, Ocean Rain. It is one of the band's highest-charting hits, reaching number 9 in the UK Singles Chart, and often cited as the band's greatest song. Ian McCulloch has said: "When I sing 'The Killing Moon', I know there isn't a band in the world who's got a song anywhere near that."
In a retrospective review of the song, Allmusic journalist Stewart Mason wrote: "The smart use of strings amplifies the elegance of the tune, bringing both a musical richness and a sense of quiet dignity to the tune."

Lyrics
According to the liner notes of Echo and the Bunnymen's Crystal Days box set, Ian McCulloch woke up one morning with the phrase "fate up against your will" in mind. In a 2015 interview McCulloch said: "I love (the song) all the more because I didn’t pore over it for days on end. One morning, I just sat bolt upright in bed with this line in my head: 'Fate up against your will. Through the thick and thin. He will wait until you give yourself to him.' You don’t dream things like that and remember them. That’s why I’ve always half credited the lyric to God. It’s never happened before or since." McCulloch attributed the use of astronomical imagery in the song to a childhood interest in space.

Music
The chords of the song were based on David Bowie's "Space Oddity", played backwards.  The arrangement of the song was partially inspired by balalaika music that Les Pattinson and Will Sergeant had heard in Russia.  The guitar solo had been recorded separately by Sergeant whilst tuning up and was inserted in the song at the suggestion of producer David Lord.  The strings on the track are a combination of Adam Peters' cello and keyboards played by the producer.

Track listing
 UK 12"
 "The Killing Moon" (All Night Version) – 9:11
 "The Killing Moon" – 5:50
 "Do It Clean" (Recorded live at the Royal Albert Hall London 18 July 1983) – 6:36

Charts

Weekly charts

Year-end charts

Notable usage and cover versions
"The Killing Moon" has been featured in films such as She Will, Donnie Darko,  and the video game Rock Band 3. Artists that have covered the song include  Pavement,  Chvrches,

References

External links
 
 Echo & The Bunnymen Official Website
 Official music video at YouTube
 
  Accolades archived at Acclaimed Music

1984 singles
Echo & the Bunnymen songs
Songs written by Ian McCulloch (singer)
Songs written by Will Sergeant
Songs written by Les Pattinson
Songs written by Pete de Freitas
1984 songs
Korova (record label) singles
Songs about death
Songs about the Moon